Phyllis Kenner Robinson (née Kenner, October 22, 1921 – December 31, 2010) was an advertising executive – a copywriter who helped create numerous notable ad campaigns. She was a foundation employee of the US agency Doyle Dane Bernbach from 1949 and was instrumental in that agency's success and growth over the next twenty years.

Career
Born in New York City, in 1942 Robinson earned a bachelor's degree in sociology in from Barnard College; she wanted to be a writer. She worked for the US government as a statistician during World War II.

After the war, she moved to Boston, and embarked on a career in advertising. After starting out at Bresnick & Solomont, she joined Grey Advertising in 1947 writing fashion promotion, where she first worked for William Bernbach. When he and Ned Doyle left Grey in 1949 to start their eponymous agency with Mac Dane their "little gold mine of people," included Robinson and the art director Bob Gage with whom she was teamed and would enjoy much creative success.

Robinson was Doyle Dane Bernbach's first chief copywriter. At DDB, she supervised a team that would produce a number of notable people in advertising, including Mary Wells Lawrence and Paula Green. Wells described Robinson's place at DDB when Wells arrived there in 1957 "By the time I arrived the gods were firmly ensconced, the pantheon was established, the rituals, the sacred writings were already beloved. The Dei Majores were the originals, Bill, Ned, Mac, Phyllis and Bob Gage; they spoke a secret language. There were talented others, the spirits and the elves, but the gods were the gods, everyone in the industry knew who was who". Years later Wells put it more simply, "I would buy a used car from Phyllis Robinson."

Robinson worked on memorable campaigns for numerous clients, including Ohrbach's, Henry S. Levy and Sons – "You don't have to be Jewish to love Levy's Real Jewish Rye", El Al Airlines, and Polaroid with a long running campaign featuring actors James Garner and Mariette Hartley. On the occasion of her death Keith Reinhard, Chairman-Emeritus of DDB Worldwide wrote "In presentations to students, I still use her campaigns for Levy's rye bread and Ohrbach's as timeless examples of how to make brands famous by writing in a conversational tone...... [The Ohrbach's ad] is great on its own merits, but the more important reason I singled it out was that, when Volkswagen decided to introduce the Beetle to the U.S. market, they did not conduct an agency search. Instead, they simply said, "We want the agency that does Ohrbach's" – and thus, thanks to Phyllis, the creative revolution was born." 

Later, she also worked in theater, co-writing the lyrics for Cry for Us All. She also wrote the books, lyrics, and music for a 1995 musical based on Bernard Malamud's short story Angel Levine and is credited as co-writer of the song "Ooh Baby Baby," first recorded by Smokey Robinson (no relation) and The Miracles in 1965.

Personal life
In 1944, she married Dr. Richard G. Robinson, who died in 2005. They had a daughter Nancy. Robinson quit full-time work at DDB in 1962 to raise her daughter, but continued to consult to the agency working three days a week through to 1968. She was 89 when she died in Manhattan.

Recognition
Robinson was inducted into the Creative Hall of Fame in 1968. For a time, she served as chairperson for the Creative Hall of Fame. In 1999, Advertising Age magazine named her one of the 100 most influential figures in the history of advertising.

Legacy
She was featured in the 2009 documentary film Art & Copy.

On International Women's Day in 2017, DDB Worldwide changed its name temporarily to DDB&R to honor Robinson.

References

1921 births
2010 deaths
American advertising executives
Barnard College alumni
American copywriters
American lyricists